Mareh Darreh (also known as Mareh Dar) is a village in Saral Rural District, Saral District, Divandarreh County, Kurdistan Province, Iran. At the 2006 census, its population was 129, in 27 families. The village is populated by Kurds.

References 

Towns and villages in Divandarreh County
Kurdish settlements in Kurdistan Province